The 1980–81 season was Port Vale's 69th season of football in the English Football League, and their third successive season (ninth overall) in the Fourth Division. A difficult season, by February the club were bottom of the Football League. However, they rallied to finish in nineteenth place, thus avoiding a re-election campaign. Advancing to the Third Round of the FA Cup, there they were humiliated by a 3–0 defeat to non-league side Enfield in front of the TV cameras. As usual, they exited the League Cup at the First Round. Despite poor crowd figures and a poor league place, John McGrath had overseen the worst of the club's dire spell, whilst new Chairman Don Ratcliffe stabilized the finances by cutting expenditure. A bleak financial picture led McGrath to focus on youth, and the Chamberlain brothers (Mark and Neville) in particular developed well to leave the club with a more optimistic future.

Overview

Fourth Division
The pre-season saw John McGrath sign two news players – Leicester City's John Allen and Stoke City's Trevor Brissett. These newcomers were all the Vale could afford, and Vale ominously failed to win any of their pre-season friendlies. The club also received a £600 fine for the disciplinary record of the previous season (by now an annual occurrence).

The season opened with a 3–0 win over Doncaster Rovers, but then Vale travelled to Roots Hall, where they were beaten 5–1 by Southend United. This defeat was the first of a run of six games in which the "Valiants" picked up just a solitary point. The Vale consistently lost away from home, but turned Vale Park into a fortress with four successive wins in Burslem. Despite this, attendances remained barely above 2,000. Injuries piled up; Gerry Keenan with ligament damage, Steve Jones with a collarbone injury, whereas Paul Bowles played on as captain despite being overweight. The club in the re-election zone, unable to attract fans, and losing £1,000 a week, Arthur MacPherson resigned as Chairman on 2 October, and was replaced by Don Ratcliffe. Mark Chamberlain was then utilized, and scored four goals in his first four games and also created goals for others. Former top-flight winger Johnny Miller then joined the club after his release from Mansfield Town. Miller's crossing ability had not diminished, and he became a key player. Young keeper Mark Harrison in good form, McGrath felt able to sell Trevor Dance to Stafford Rangers for £10,000. Their upturn in form tailed off, and their 4–0 defeat at Plainmoor on 5 November was played in front of a then Torquay United record-low crowd of 1,227 fans. A 1–0 victory over Southend United was the only win in a sequence of fourteen league games.

In December, John Rudge was upgraded from coach to assistant manager. However, poor league form continued; on 27 December Vale lost 5–1 to Northampton Town at the County Ground, and Phil Sproson was sent off for swearing at teammate Russell Bromage. More away defeats came, with the Vale defence insistent on playing dangerous balls on the outside of their penalty area. On 24 January, they lost 5–0 at Field Mill to Mansfield Town, this left them at the foot of the league, four points adrift of safety. McGrath brought in two new signings: big defender Andy Higgins from Chesterfield and midfielder Terry Armstrong; Higgins was restricted mainly to away matches as there the team needed the added strength and height that he provided. He also signed keeper Brian Lloyd on loan from Chester City, and the former Wales international proved to be a revelation. McGrath then installed a five-man defence away from home, the tactic proved a success, as Vale avoided defeat in all but two of their final eight away games. McGrath later reflected that "that Mansfield match was a dreadful experience, I simply could not wait any longer before taking some action; we had to get some better players." Vale went on a streak of seven games unbeaten, recording a 4–0 win over fellow strugglers Hereford United. On 26 April, the club started a club-record run of six consecutive draws, which would end on 12 September the next season. Their goalless draw with Crewe Alexandra at Gresty Road assured them of safety from re-election.

They finished nineteenth place with 39 points, three points clear of the re-election places. For the third consecutive season they had conceded seventy goals, and only Tranmere Rovers and Halifax Town conceded more. The Chamberlain brothers were the top scorers in the league with nine goals, whilst Neville scored thirteen in all competitions. McGrath said "it has taken time, but the attitude [of the team] is slowly changing."

Finances
On the financial side, a £12,496 loss was announced. Income was supplemented by an intake of £174,890 from the commercial department. An average home attendance of 2,738 was the lowest since the club regained their Football League status in 1921. Nevertheless, spending had been slashed to bring finances under control. Six players left at the end of the season on free transfers, most significantly: Neil Griffiths (Crewe Alexandra), Steve Jones, Alan Woolfall (Marine), and John Allen (Hinckley Athletic). Loanee Lloyd also returned to his club, despite the fans demands to sign him up. Kenny Beech was sold to Walsall for £10,000.

Cup competitions
In the FA Cup, Vale advanced past Bradford City with a 4–2 win, the Chamberlain brothers in deadly form. "Bantams" manager George Mulhall said "it could have been ten!". With Harrison injured, Vale then used Derby County loanee keeper Steve Cherry in a 'magnificent' 1–1 draw with Burnley at Turf Moor. Vale then finished off the Third Division outfit at home with a 2–0 win in front of a season-high crowd of 7,722. Drawn against Isthmian League side Enfield in the Third Round, they drew 1–1 at Vale Park before they 'died in shame' with a 3–0 defeat in the replay. This was the first time the Vale had been knocked out of the competition by a non-league club since Gainsborough Trinity beat them 2–1 in 1937. Port Vale were Enfield's third scalp of the season after Barnsley and Hereford United. The loss came in front of the television cameras, and was particularly humiliating as Enfield's keeper had a quiet afternoon and Cherry gifted Enfield their second goal with a horrible miskick.

In the League Cup, Neville Chamberlain scored after only fifty seconds in a 3–2 home defeat by Tranmere Rovers. Vale then beat 1–0 at Prenton Park to exit the competition on away goals.

League table

Results
Port Vale's score comes first

Football League Fourth Division

Results by matchday

Matches

FA Cup

League Cup

Player statistics

Appearances

Top scorers

Transfers

Transfers in

Transfers out

Loans in

Loans out

References
Specific

General

Port Vale F.C. seasons
Port Vale